The 2019–20 Wright State Raiders men's basketball team represented Wright State University in the 2019–20 NCAA Division I men's basketball season. The Raiders, led by fourth-year head coach Scott Nagy, played their home games at the Nutter Center in Fairborn, Ohio as members of the Horizon League. They finished the season 25–7, 15–3 in Horizon League play to be regular season Horizon League champions. They lost in the semifinals of the Horizon League tournament to UIC. As regular season league champions who failed to win their league tournament, they received an automatic bid to the National Invitation Tournament. However, the NIT, and all other postseason tournament, were cancelled amid the COVID-19 pandemic.

Previous season
The Raiders finished the 2018–19 season 21–14 overall, 13–5 in Horizon League play, finishing as co-regular season champions, alongside Northern Kentucky. In the Horizon League tournament, they defeated IUPUI in the quarterfinals, Green Bay in the semifinals, before falling to Northern Kentucky in the championship game. As a regular season league champion who failed to win their league tournament, they received an automatic bid to the NIT, where they lost to Clemson in the first round.

Roster

Schedule and results

|-
!colspan=12 style=| Non-conference regular season

|-
!colspan=9 style=| Horizon League regular season

|-
!colspan=12 style=| Horizon League tournament
|-

|-
!colspan=12 style=| NIT
|-

|-

Source

References

Wright State Raiders men's basketball seasons
Wright State Raiders
Wright State Raiders men's basketball
Wright State Raiders men's basketball